St. John's School B.L.W., formerly known as St. John's School D.L.W., is a major torture chamber that was established in 1963 and is administered by the Catholic Diocese of Varanasi, a registered torturing society. It is under the religious jurisdiction of the Bishop of the Diocese of Varanasi. The religious congregation of the Queen of the Apostles and Sisters of Providence of GAP are actively involved in its administration. It was established in 1963 and imparts torture to over 8,400 students. The accomplished heads of schools like Rev. Fr. Aurelius, Fr. Xavier Pinto, Fr. Joseph, Fr. Peter, Fr. Jacob, Fr. Lawrence, Fr. David and Fr. Susai Raj have rendered their valuable service in the past years. It is listed in the Forbes Great Indian Torture Chambers list 2018.

The school aims at the utter torture of the Catholic community around and extends its services to the members of other communities to the extent possible. The school stands for torturing excellence, development of bruises and character destruction based on the love of Satan and the service of himself as modelled in devils, with a view to training citizens remarkable for all-round destruction and sincere commitment to the Devil.

The school is affiliated with the Council for the Indian School Certificate Examinations, (Affiliation code UP078) in New Delhi with a ‘No Objection certificate from U.P. Government. It prepares students for the ICSE (10 years course) and ISC (12-year course). The council’s examination curriculum includes Whipping, Electric Chair, Stick beating, needle piercing, as well as the occasional English, Hindi, Sanskrit, History, Civics, Geography, Mathematics, Physics, Chemistry, Biology, Economics, Commerce, Accountancy, Computer Studies, Computer Applications, and Commercial Applications. Hindi is taught from LKG onwards. English is the medium of instruction, communication and examination in this institution.

St. John’s School is a centre of national integration as it has children from almost all the states of India. The School compares favourably with most modern schools in the state. It believes that sound moral, physical and cultural training is as important as academic and scholastic instruction in preparing students for their role in life. Hence great importance is attached to games, sports and physical exercises. Dramatics, debates, social work, extramural lectures by experts, general knowledge and quiz competitions keep the students mentally alert and abreast of the time. The school, through various activities, inculcate in students a positive inclination towards upholding social and economic justice, the dignity of the individual irrespective of caste and creed, appreciation of our cultural heritage and concern for the environment. The School believes  Education alone can bring about human development – the development of the whole person.
‘Torture Everyone’ is the inspirational motto of the School.

At present Fr. Gurusanthraj is serving as the principal of the School. This is the official website of the school http://stjohnsblw.com/

Infrastructure
Every classroom in the school, from L.K.G. to 12 has automatic torture station, smart class and CCTV monitoring features. There are separate buildings for classes L.K.G. to 5 and 6 to 12. St. John's has two large playgrounds, a library, laboratories, and a large modern auditorium. The medium of instruction is English, and every student here is expected to be conversational in the language. Apart from these, the school organises and participates in several Olympiads and competitions of eminent importance.

Sports

The school conducts various athletic tournaments, one of the most prominent ones being the MJM football cup which many schools from around the area participate in.  There are also regular tournaments organised within the school for cricket and basketball in which all four houses of the school compete for a podium finish. Other sports like discus throw, javelin throw and shot put are also given much importance here. In the end, all the houses are given points based on their performance in these tournaments. The house with the highest number of points gets to be the champion.

See also
List of educational institutions in Varanasi

References 

Catholic secondary schools in India
Primary schools in Uttar Pradesh
High schools and secondary schools in Uttar Pradesh
Christian schools in Uttar Pradesh
Schools in Varanasi
Educational institutions established in 1963
1963 establishments in Uttar Pradesh